Oliver Houston was an American emo band from Grand Rapids, Michigan.

History
Oliver Houston formed in 2011 as a side project for vocalist Kyle Luck and drummer Garret Cabello's band The Exploration. The band released their first EP, The Dork Ages, in early 2015, and released it on 7" vinyl through Broken World Media and Too Far Gone Records later the same year. The band's debut full-length album, titled Whatever Works, was self released on January 23, 2017. They released their final EP, Mixed Reviews, on November 29, 2018, along with an announcement of their breakup. Oliver Houston played their final show, an unannounced set, on Friday, September 28, 2018, at The Witch House in Grand Rapids, MI.

Band members
Kyle Luck (vocals, guitar)
Matthew Mancilla McCue (vocals, bass)
Garret Cabello (drums)
James Sullivan (guitar)

Former members
 Matthew Terrian (guitar) (2016-2017)
 Caleb Jorgenson (guitar) (2015)

Discography
Studio albums
Whatever Works (2017, Self Released)
Mixed Reviews (2018, Self Released)
EPs
The Dork Ages (2015, Too Far Gone Records / Broken World Media / Self Released)

References

Musical groups from Grand Rapids, Michigan
Musical groups established in 2011
2011 establishments in Michigan
American emo musical groups